NOTCH is an Indian entertainment and lifestyle online magazine. It is part of privately held Pradeep Dadha Group of Companies, with Pradeep Dadha as chairman. NOTCH'''s corporate office is located in Chennai, India.

History
The online magazine was launched in September 2012, and the cover of the first issue featured Bollywood actress Kareena Kapoor. In addition to stories, the magazine includes multimedia content.

Target audienceNOTCH'' is geared to Indian consumers as well as non-resident Indians (NRI) living outside of India.

References

External links

2012 establishments in Tamil Nadu
English-language magazines published in India
Online magazines published in India
Monthly magazines published in India
Lifestyle magazines
Magazines established in 2012
Mass media in Chennai